The Spanish settlement in Jamaica was a settlement that originated from the 16th century, when Jamaica was Spanish, ending essentially in 1655, the date on which Spain delivered the island to the British Crown under the Treaty of Madrid. However, there were never significant Spanish communities on the island, which was why it easily occupied by the British.

Historia 
The arrival of Spaniards in Jamaica began in 1494, with the arrival of Christopher Columbus to the island in search of gold (as in Cuba and the Spanish, where he had reported the existence of the island, called Xaymaca by the Taino, in the indigenous language, "land of springs " later "land of wood and water" by the English), but then discovered that there was no gold on the island. Columbus named the island Santiago and used it as a mini-state for his family. In addition, he and his sailors founded other settlements, such as Santa Gloria (now St. Ann's Bay), named by Columbus, as it was the first that was sighted when they came to Jamaica.

In 1505 Juan de Guzman, Duke of Medina Sidonia in agreement with Columbus proposed a project to populate the island but Ferdinand turned it down because he worried that the cumulative power nobiliary house. In 1509 the first Spanish settlement on the island was founded which was named New Sevilla and was located in a place near Santa Gloria. As early as 1510, the first governor of Jamaica, Juan de Esquivel, was appointed and the island was incorporated into the Viceroyalty of New Spain.

In 1524, the settlers left New Seville and, around 1534, moved to the current Spanish Town, founded by the colonial governor of Jamaica Francisco de Garay with the name of Our Lady of the Blessed Villa de la Vega, Santiago de la Vega, St. Jago de la Vega or Villa de la Vega (the place that the English renamed Spanish Town when they conquered the island in 1655). Here the oldest cathedral in Jamaica was built.  Eventually, the Spanish founded other settlements elsewhere across the island (such as Las Chorreras or Eight rivers, and Santa Cruz), but that city was chosen as the capital of Jamaica. The settlers, as they used to do in the colonies in which they settled, took crops (such as sugar cane and banana) and pets (including dogs, cats, and horses), to Jamaica. 

Most Spaniards arrived on the island for gold and silver but due to its absence in Jamaica, they generally neglected the island, being based only on the coastal plains, mainly in the northern part of the island. So, Jamaica became a center mainly for supply and rest.

However, from 1595, pirates, buccaneers, and English privateers began to attack the island with some frequency, in order to challenge the papal bull, which stated that all territories of the new world belonged to the kingdoms of Castile and Portugal. The 1596 attack was followed by attacks in 1603, 1640, and 1643. Thus, the Spanish were forcibly evicted by the English at Ocho Rios in St. Ann. However, it was in 1655 when the English army, led by the British Admiral Sir William Penn and General Robert Venables, finally occupied the island, taking over the last Spanish fort in Jamaica.

Dominated the Spanish colony by the British, the fear of loss of the island official from Spain meant that, in 1659, the political and noble Spanish Juan Francisco de Leiva, began to develop means to expel foreigners on the island, proposed sending a "dispatched armed Peninsula, full of people who should be working and enjoyment such as the Canary". Thus, a group of Spanish soldiers came to Jamaica, who settled in the already Santiago de la Vega, reinforcing this Spanish community in the capital of the island, to exert greater resistance to British occupation. Meanwhile, in 1660, was named the first British governor of Jamaica, Edward D'Oyley. The British government was already a sign of sovereignty, but Spain did not recognize Jamaica as a British colony until 1670.

Furthermore, in 1660, as in other Spanish colonies, Jamaica became a refuge for Jews, also attracting those who had been expelled from Spain and Portugal. Already in 1510, an agreement had been signed with the Jews, shortly after the son of Christopher Columbus was established on the island. The Jewish community in Jamaica, mainly composed of merchants and traders, were forced to lead a secret life, calling themselves "Portugals". All this increased the Hispanic community on the island.

With the signing of the Treaty of Madrid in 1670, Spain finally gave Jamaica and the Cayman Islands to the UK. After the official British occupation of the island, the Spanish colonists fled after freeing their slaves, which were scattered throughout the mountains, joining the Maroons, slaves who had previously escaped from the Spanish to live with the Taínos. The Jamaican Maroons fought the British during the 18th century

After the British took Jamaica, the Jews of the colony, many of whom were from Spain and Portugal, decided that the best defense to try to prevent the recovery of the island from Spain was encouraged to make the colony a base for pirates of the Caribbean. With pirates installed in Puerto Real, the Spanish would be deterred from attacking. British leaders agreed on the feasibility of this strategy to prevent aggression was abroad.

Legado 
According to JJ Bruton, apart from Santiago de la Vega, other places named by the Spaniards during this time, and extending across the island are eight rivers (also known as Robert Wallace Thompson, Las Chorreras by Spanish coloniales5) Rio Bueno, Santa Cruz, 6 Miño7 River and Port Antonio (also known as Thompson, during the Spanish era, Puerto Antón) .6 Also, the name of Montego Bay, the capital of St. James Parish, could lead according Bruton, the Spanish name Bay butter, referring to the large number of pigs used there in the industry butter, 12 and the people Oracabessa derived surely the Spanish word Cabeza de Oro with which would be designated the people during the Spanish domination of all, due to the existence of a nearby hill to the region, whose summit is covered, at certain times of the year, yellow flowers. For its part, the names of other places, according to the author, are a translation of the names by which the Spaniards called it: Thus Bay Dry Harbour (Puerto Seco) was a place where he entered Colón for water when he sought refuge with two caravels already in bad shape and partially destroyed. Runaway Bay (Bay Escape), meanwhile, is a bay from which fled in 1665, the Spanish governor of the island, Ysassi, bound for Cuba. On the other hand, the town's name derive from the Spanish Moneague The adjective Monte de Agua (the name by which the Spaniards called it because it is a village surrounded by hills, one of which emanates a creek) 7 or, as Yates, La Manigua, word much used in Cuba to refer to a dense forest and impenetrable.5 Some Spanish gentilicios of the island, however, have been lost, such is the case of the Río de la Villa (Current Copper River name appointed to the region by the British, probably as HP Jacobs, after seeing the word copper on a map, pointing at one point there, and believe that was the name of the Rio5) and river near Spanish Town, Boca Water, river is now called Bog Walk (Paseo del Pantano) .7 However, Robert Wallace Thompson rejects the idea of Bruton on the relationship between the current names of Jamaican places mentioned the names designated by the Spanish in the same the absence, according to him, documents and colonial sources indicating, if you like, the existence of those names during the Spanish era of the island, indicating that such names derive from Indian words (Orocabezzas, perhaps Orocavis, word found in Santo Domingo) or English (Ocho Rios, Port Antonio maybe).

The Spanish introduced many crops to Jamaica like: sugar cane, bananas and citrus fruits. Also it was they who apparently introduced most of the pets that are currently on the island, such as pigs, horses, goats, cats, dogs and chickens.

History of the Colony of Santiago